Susannah Gordon Hunnewell (July 16, 1966 – June 15, 2019) was an American editor and publisher. She was the publisher of The Paris Review. Hunnewell was born in Boston and spent much of her life in Paris. In 2018 she was named as a Chevalier of the French order of arts and letters.

References

1966 births
2019 deaths
American expatriates in France
American publishers (people)
Chevaliers of the Ordre des Arts et des Lettres
Deaths from cancer in New York (state)
Harvard University alumni
The Paris Review
Writers from Boston